The Talk may refer to:

 The Talk (talk show), an American daytime talk show on CBS that debuted in 2010
 "The Talk" (Mortified), an episode of Mortified
 The talk (racism in the United States), a conversation Black American parents have with their children about the dangers they'll face due to racism
 The talk (sex education), the discusion by parents, with their children, about sexual relationships, functions, and results

See also
 Talk (disambiguation)
 Talk show (disambiguation)
 The Talk Show (disambiguation)